The 2014–15 Southern Conference men's basketball season began on November 14, 2014, and concluded in March with the 2015 Southern Conference men's basketball tournament played at the U.S. Cellular Center in Asheville, North Carolina.

Following the previous season's departure of Appalachian State, Georgia Southern, Davidson, and Elon from the league, three new members were added - East Tennessee State, Mercer, and VMI. Both ETSU and VMI had previously competed in the SoCon, as the Buccaneers left for the Atlantic Sun Conference in 2005, while VMI spent eleven years in the Big South. Mercer came from the Atlantic Sun as well. With ten league members, the conference schedule featured a full round-robin with two games against every opponent, totaling eighteen, up from sixteen the previous season.

Wofford, the preseason favorites, cruised through the SoCon regular season with a 16–2 conference record en route to their second straight conference tournament title. Wofford senior guard Karl Cochran was named Player of the Year, while fellow Terrier Lee Skinner was named tournament MVP.

Awards and honors
 Player of the Year:  Karl Cochran, Wofford
 Freshman of the Year: Devin Sibley, Furman
 Defense Player of the Year: Justin Tuoyo, Chattanooga
 Coach of the Year: Mike Young, Wofford

All–SoCon Teams

All-Conference Team

All-Freshman

Postseason

SoCon tournament

Bracket
 

* denotes overtime period

NCAA tournament

College Basketball Invitational

Head coaches

Will Wade, Chattanooga
Chuck Driesell, The Citadel
Murry Bartow, ETSU
Niko Medved, Furman
Bob Hoffman, Mercer

Scott Padgett, Samford
Wes Miller, UNC Greensboro
Duggar Baucom, VMI
Larry Hunter, Western Carolina
Mike Young, Wofford

References